Mitchell Ranges are a mountain range in Arnhem Land located approximately  east of Darwin in the Northern Territory, of Australia.

Several peaks are found within the range including; Mount Parson, Mount Fleming, Mount Ramsay and Mount Fawcett. The Parson Range is in the sound of the range.

The rocks that make up the range are Proterozoic sedimentary and include pebbly sandstones, moderately folded quartz sandstone, feldspathic sandstone and arkose.

References

Mountain ranges of the Northern Territory